Yelli is the song sung by Baka women early in the morning.

See also
Baka Beyond
Baka (Cameroon and Gabon)

External links
The Baka - Songs and Rhythms:YELLI

Cameroonian songs
Year of song unknown
Songwriter unknown